Gigafactory Mexico (also Gigafactory 6) is a proposed manufacturing plant for Tesla, Inc. to be constructed near Monterrey in Nuevo León, Mexico.

The facility was officially announced by Mexican President Andrés Manuel López Obrador on 28 February 2023. The following day at Tesla Investor Day, Tesla CEO Elon Musk confirmed the facility would be used to build Tesla's next-generation vehicle, and subsequent vehicles on the same platform.

Description 
Tesla will build the gigafactory near Monterrey. The factory will be an approximately US$10 billion dollar investment by Tesla, and will employ thousands of workers when fully operational, as well as employ many thousands of workers during construction.

See also 
 List of Tesla factories

References 

Tesla factories
Motor vehicle assembly plants in Mexico
Proposed buildings and structures in Mexico
Companies based in Monterrey